Schools' Challenge is the national general knowledge competition for schools in the United Kingdom, founded by Colin Galloway in 1978. It uses the same quiz bowl rules as University Challenge, although it is affiliated with neither the game nor the television show. Schools Challenge is divided into Senior and Junior competitions.

Competition structure 
Senior Schools' Challenge is for students of secondary school age (11–18 years old).  However, a typical team predominantly draws on Year 9 to Year 13. Each team comprises four members, two of whom are 'Juniors' and must be no older than the normal age for a Year 10 student. The other two can be of any age and are 'Seniors' regardless of age. Junior Schools Challenge is for students up to and including the normal age for a Year 8 student. Again, there are four members in each team but there are no restrictions on the numbers of any students from the age groups allowed in this competition.

The competition is divided this way because of the incongruence between the private school system and grammar or comprehensive schools' systems. In some independent school systems students attend a preparatory school until the age of 13, after which time they transfer to another school. Schools' Challenge has had to work around this so that no school has an unfair advantage in terms of age.

Both Senior and Junior competitions are divided into roughly 16 regions covering the entire UK. Northern Ireland, Scotland, and Wales each comprise a separate region, though Northern Ireland currently is on hiatus from the Senior competition. Each region has a coordinator, the Regional Organiser, who in turn answers to the National Organisers.

The competition starts with each respective region's tournament. The number of teams that participate in each region varies, with some regions larger/smaller than others (with northern regions generally more populous than southern regions despite regular reorganisation). Then, the eventual regional winners play an inter-regional round against the winners of a neighbouring region - the eight winners (unless the host did not win their inter-regional) of which participate in the national finals to contest the Schools' Challenge shield. The runners-up of the School Challenge competition also receive a smaller shield.  Teams who lose in the first round of the national final contest (the quarter-finals) enter the repechage contest for the Schools' Challenge Plate. The finals are contested in a single day, normally the last Sunday in April for the Senior competition and the third or fourth Sunday in June for the Junior competition, at a centrally-placed venue.

The national competition has since 1985 been organised by Paul and Sue Sims, assisted by regional coordinators. They retired from the national organisation in September 2022, and were replaced by Robert Grant, Christopher-Fletcher Campbell & Ben Mooney.

Rules
The game is played to almost-identical rules to the TV show University Challenge.  Starter questions are asked to all contestants and the first to buzz must answer immediately (or the full question is passed to the other team).  The team that correctly answers a buzzer question is then asked three 'bonus' questions which they may confer on and which may be passed to the other team.  The main differences between Schools Challenge and University Challenge are:

No points are deducted for incorrectly interrupting a starter question on the buzzer.
Bonus questions are worth 10 points each and are passed across to the other team if answered incorrectly.
A team answering the starter and all three subsequent bonuses correctly gains an extra bonus of 10 points: thus 50 points are available per round.
There are no picture rounds or music rounds.
The contestant who buzzes first must wait for the quiz master's signal that they should give their answer. Failure to comply with these regulations may leave the contestant's answer void.

Equipment
8-player lockout buzzers, common in competitions of this format are used and are supplied by tournament organisers if a hosting school cannot supply the equipment.  Tournament rules do not specify a manufacturer, but the older Jaser Quizmaster system is used in many regions, although this is now obsolete. Participants may also use a website with buzzer facilities.

The use of an electronic scoreboard, which can be projected onto an interactive whiteboard or screen, is commonplace, especially in Regional and National Finals.

Notable Successes 
The most successful team in the competition's history are Westminster School, who won each year from 2005 to 2009, in 2016, 2018 and 2020. The only team to have won the Senior and Junior competitions in the same season (2014 and 2019) is The Perse School, Cambridge. Other consistently successful teams in both Junior and Senior competitions are The Haberdashers' Aske's Boys' School, Hereford Cathedral School, King Edward's School, Birmingham, Lancaster Royal Grammar School, Nottingham High School and Calday Grange Grammar School; and in the Junior competition only, Dulwich Prep London (previously known as Dulwich College Preparatory School). The Abbey Christian Brothers' Grammar School, Newry have so far been the only team from Northern Ireland to win at the Senior National Finals. However, the quality of schools can be changeable (perhaps as older members leave) and it is not uncommon to see a school do well in the competition for the first time in many years.

So far, the only all-female teams ever to qualify for the Senior National Finals (four times in all) have been from Bournemouth School for Girls. BSG’s 2019 team is to date the most successful all girls' team in the Senior competition’s history, having beaten King Edward VI Grammar School, Chelmsford (in the latter's first foray past the regional rounds in thirteen years) to win the Plate Final. All-female teams have been rather more successful in the Junior competition: King Edward VI High School for Girls, Birmingham (1987 and 2005), Withington Girls' School (1991), Chelmsford County High School for Girls (1993) Kesteven and Grantham Girls' School (2003), Haberdashers' Monmouth School for Girls (2004), Sacred Heart Grammar School, Newry (2006 and 2016) and Wakefield Girls' High School (2013). King Edward VI High School for Girls has been the only all-female team to have won the Junior National Finals (in 1987); Chelmsford County High School for Girls were runners-up in 1993.

Schools Challenge 2019–20 
Due to the COVID-19 pandemic causing the closure of secondary schools in early 2020, the decision was made to conduct the remaining stages (the nationals and the inter-regionals) of the competition predominantly via the video app Zoom. However, the inter-regional rounds that were not completed before the closure of schools were conducted as a 15-minute quiz test, rather than on buzzers as is usual or on Zoom as the national rounds were played.

The seven (Exeter School was also to play, but dropped out and was replaced by KES B) teams in the national finals were The Perse School, Calday Grange, Dollar Academy, Westminster School, King Edward VI Grammar School Chelmsford, and Warwick School, who would have hosted the competition. Due to one team dropping out, King Edward's School got a 'bye' to the semi-finals (they played their own B team, technically).

In the 2019-20 Junior Competition, The Perse School retained their title from the previous year, defeating the Dragon School, Oxford in the final. The junior plate competition was won by King's School, Rochester.

COVID-19 caused the cancellation of the 2020–21 season. The competition recommenced in the academic year 2021–22.

Competition History - Senior

Multiple Winners

Competition History - Junior

Multiple Winners 

*Dulwich Prep London had previously been known as Dulwich College Preparatory School.

References

|}

British game shows
Student quiz competitions
Competitions in the United Kingdom